Neville Hawkins (born 5 September 1936) is a Jamaican cricketer. He played in seven first-class matches for the Jamaican cricket team from 1963 to 1967.

See also
 List of Jamaican representative cricketers

References

External links
 

1936 births
Living people
Jamaican cricketers
Jamaica cricketers